Marvin Allen (born November 23, 1965) is a former professional American football player who played running back in the National Football League (NFL) for four seasons for the New England Patriots. He now serves as the assistant general manager of the Miami Dolphins.

After retiring from playing, Allen worked in the New England Patriots' personnel department from 1993 through 2008.  In 2009, he left New England for the Atlanta Falcons, working there through the 2013 NFL season.  From 2014 through 2017, he was the Kansas City Chief's Director of College Scouting.  In 2018, he was a National Scout for the Buffalo Bills.

References

1965 births
American football running backs
New England Patriots players
Tulane Green Wave football players
Tyler Apaches football players
Living people